The Armenian Review is an academic journal that has been published in Watertown, Massachusetts since 1948. It publishes articles on topics related to Armenia and Armenians, and articles dealing with other themes and countries that use a comparative approach or help to comprehend the Armenian experience.

At times Armenian Review was published on a quarterly basis, but it has been irregular and sporadic during most of the 1990s and early 2000s (decade). Since 2008 the Armenian Review has updated its website and has published 4 issues. It is currently published twice a year: in May and in November.

External links

Armenian-American culture in Massachusetts
Publications established in 1948
1948 establishments in Massachusetts